The 1966 European Junior Games was the second edition of the biennial athletics competition for European athletes aged under twenty. It was the first edition to have received official support from the European Athletic Association, following the unofficial first edition in 1964. The event was held at the Central Stadium Chornomorets in Odessa, Ukrainian SSR, Soviet Union, on 24 and 25 September.

Men's results

Women's results

Medal table

References

Results
European Junior Championships 1966 - Men's results. Retrieved on 2018-07-19.
European Junior Championships 1966 - Women's results. Retrieved on 2018-07-19.

European Athletics U20 Championships
International athletics competitions hosted by the Soviet Union
European Junior
Sport in Odesa
1966 in Soviet sport
International athletics competitions hosted by Ukraine
1966 in youth sport
Euro